Jean Charbonneau (1875 – 25 October 1960) was a French-Canadian poet who was the main founder of the Montreal Literary School.

Publications 
1912: Les blessures , Paris, Lemerre
1916–1920: Des influences françaises au Canada (three volumes), Montréal, Beauchemin
1921: L'Âge de Sang, Paris, Lemerre
1923: Les Prédestinés, Montréal, Beauchemin
1924: L'Ombre dans le miroir, Montréal, Beauchemin
1928: La Flamme ardente, Montréal, Beauchemin
1935: 
1940: Tel qu'en sa solitude... Poèmes, Montréal, Éditions B. Valiquette, Éditions A.C.F.

References

External links 
 Jean Charbonneau

1875 births
1960 deaths
20th-century Canadian poets
Canadian male poets
Canadian poets in French
Writers from Montreal
Fellows of the Royal Society of Canada
20th-century Canadian male writers